Ornette Glenn (born March 16, 1970), better known by his stage name Self Jupiter, is an American rapper from Los Angeles, California. He is a member of Freestyle Fellowship alongside Myka 9, P.E.A.C.E., and Aceyalone. He is also one half of The Kleenrz alongside Kenny Segal.

Career
Self Jupiter released a collaborative album with producer Kenny Segal, titled The Kleenrz, on Hellfyre Club in 2012. It featured guest appearances from Subtitle, Murs, Volume 10, and Abstract Rude, among others. The duo's second album, titled Season 2, was released on The Order Label in 2016. In 2019, Self Jupiter released a studio album, titled Sexy Beast.

Discography

Studio albums
 Hard Hat Area (2000)
 The Kleenrz (2012) 
 Myriad of Thoughts (2013) 
 The Legend of 1900 (2014) 
 Season 2 (2016) 
 Sexy Beast (2019)

EPs
 Vista View Park Art District (2015)
 Ear Worm (2020)

Singles
 "Mayday" (2000)
 "Life Doesn't Get No Better Than This" (2001)
 "Don't Say Nathan" (2014)
 "Big Business" (2015) 
 "Love Me" (2017)
 "Cali Co-Op" (2017)
 "The Lemongrass Song" (2017)
 "Layers" (2018)
 "Before I Kill the Beat" (2019)

Guest appearances
 Omid - "When the Sun Took a Day Off and the Moon Stood Still" from Beneath the Surface (1998)
 Abstract Rude - "Heavyweights Round 4" from P.A.I.N.T. (2001)
 Myka 9 - "Danger (OG Version)" from Timetable (2001)
 Aceyalone - "So Much Pain" from Love & Hate (2003)
 Fat Jack - "You're Lost" from Cater to the DJ 2 (2004)
 Rifleman - "Original World Wide Choppers" from Warrior's Euphoria (2013)
 Blaq Tongue Society - "Terraform" from Blaq Tongue Society (2013)
 Tash & Black Silver - "You Wont" from Blood, Sweat & Beers (2013)
 Cquel - "Funny Style" from Sentencing Circle (2014)
 Gel Roc & Joe Dub - "We All Stars" from From the Vault (2014)
 Agallah - "The Heist" from Bo: The Legend of the Water Dragon (2016)
 Milo - "Ornette's Swan Song" from Who Told You to Think??!!?!?!?! (2017)
 Blu & Oh No - "Round Bout Midnight" from A Long Red Hot Los Angeles Summer Night (2019)
 Billy Woods & Kenny Segal - "Speak Gently" from Hiding Places (2019)

Compilation appearances
 "Who's There?", "Hot" and "Heavyweights Round 2" on Project Blowed (1995)
 "It Was on This Night" on Tags of the Times 3 (2001)
 "GB BBQ" and "Lolita" on The Good Brothers (2003)

References

External links
 
 

1970 births
Living people
African-American male rappers
Rappers from Los Angeles
Alternative hip hop musicians
West Coast hip hop musicians
21st-century American rappers
21st-century American male musicians
Project Blowed
21st-century African-American musicians
20th-century African-American people